"Preach" is a song by American singer-songwriter John Legend. It was written by Greg Kurstin and Sarah Aarons and produced by Greg Kurstin. Released as a single by John Legend Music and Sony Music Entertainment on February 15, 2019, it reached number twelve on the US Billboard Adult R&B Songs chart.

Track listing

Personnel
Credits adapted from the liner notes of "Preach".

Backing vocals – Sarah Aarons
Engineering – Alex Pasco, Julian Burg and Greg Kurstin
Guitar – Greg Kurstin
Keyboards, bass guitar – Greg Kurstin

Mastering – Randy Merrill
Mixing – John Hanes and Serban Ghenea
Production, drums – Greg Kurstin
Writing – Greg Kurstin, Sarah Aarons and John Legend

Charts

References

2019 singles
2019 songs
John Legend songs
Songs written by Greg Kurstin
Songs written by John Legend
Songs written by Sarah Aarons
Contemporary R&B ballads
Sony Music singles
Columbia Records singles